The 2011 National Camogie League was won by Wexford, their third league title in succession. The final was played on April 17, 2011 as a curtain raiser to the hurling match between Tipperary and Wexford at Semple Stadium and drew an attendance of 4,180.

Summary
The first National Camogie League Match ever to be televised live opened the season, an unfortunately one-sided encounter under lights in Croke Park in which Kilkenny (7-16) beat Dublin (0-5), televised by Setanta Sports. 
The eight teams in the first division (Offaly having been promoted since 2010) were drawn into two groups of four. Each team played one another once only. The top two in each group contested the semi-finals. Since 2006 the league is organized into four divisions, with 22 competing county teams graded into four divisions, with the strongest teams in Division 1.
The semi-finals were contested at Nowlan Park, Kilkenny on 3 April 201q, in which Galway won revenge for the previous year, beating Kilkenny with a last minute point from Veronica Curtin, and Wexford defeated Tipperary with first-half goals from Una Leacy, Kate Kelly and Katrina Parrock.   
In the final at Semple Stadium Thurles on Sunday, 17 April 2011, Wexford’s player-of-the-match Una Leacy scored three goals, one from a penalty, against |Galway. Wexford led by 1-5 to 0-6 at half-time.
Eleven counties in Division 2 were drawn in two groups of five and six, including the second teams of Cork, Galway, Kilkenny, Tipperary and Wexford, champions for the past two seasons. The divisional competition was marred by the withdrawal of the previous year’s third division champions, Laois.  Waterford defeated Antrim by a point in the Division 2 final.
Five teams contested Division 3, including the second team of Dublin with Meath topping the table and defeating Kildare by a point in a very competitive final.
Four counties contested Division 4. London dropped out and Cavan re-entered the competition, but the divisional fixtures were incomplete as Carlow contesting just one of their three fixtures. Westmeath  defeated Cavan in the final.

Fixtures and results

Group 1

Group 2

Final stages

Series statistics

Scoring
Widest winning margin: 32 points
Wexford 7-16 : 0-5 Dublin
Most goals in a match: 7
Wexford 7-16 : 0-5 Dublin
Widest winning margin (other divisions): 26 points
Derry 7-14: 0-9 Down

Division 2

GROUP 1
 Feb 13 Galway 2-9 Wexford 1-8 Ballinasloe
 Feb 27 Galway 0-16 Down 0-6 Ballinderry
 Feb 27 Antrim 3-6 Tipperary 3-4 Craobh Chiarain
 Mar 13 Galway 1-12 Derry Duggan Pk
 Mar 13 Antrim 1-11 Down 0-4 Clonduff
 Mar 20 Antrim 4-11 Galway 0-12 Sarsfields, Belfast
 Mar 20 Wexford 4-6 Derry 3-7 Craobh Chiarain
 Mar 27 Down 3-10 Wexford 2-12 Blakestown, Co Dublin
 Mar 27 Antrim 3-14 Derry 0-13 St Mary’s, Banagher, Co Derry
 Apr 2 Derry 7-14 Down 0-9 Bellaghy

Group one table

GROUP 2
 Feb 13 Limerick 1-11 Tipperary 2- 8 Ahane
 Feb 27 Cork 0-11 Tipperary 0-6 The Ragg
 Feb 27 Waterford 0-11 Limerick 0-8 Fraher Field, Dungarvan
 Mar 13 Kilkenny 0-10 Tipperary 0-8 Kilmanagh
 Mar 13 Waterford 2-13 Cork 2-11, Cork Institute of Technology
 Mar 20 Kilkenny 1-12 11 Limerick 1-7 Tullogher
 Mar 20 Tipperary 0-13 Waterford 1-10 The Ragg
 Mar 27 Cork 3-15 Limerick 3-8 Ahane
 Mar 27 Waterford 1-9 Kilkenny 1-9 Walsh Park
 Apr 2 Cork 1-19 Kilkenny 1-4 Cork Institute of Technology

Group 2 Table

Division 2 Group 2 play-off
 Apr 10 Waterford 1-12 Cork 1-9 St Catherine’s, Ballynoe, Co Cork

Division 2 Final
Apr 17 Waterford 0-16 Antrim 2-9 Donaghmore, Ashbourne

Division 3

 Feb 13 Kildare 2-4 Armagh 2-3 Straffan
 Feb 13 Meath 1-7 Dublin 0-5 Trim
 Feb 27 Kildare 0-12 Roscommon 0-3 Athleague
 Feb 27 Meath 3-12 Dublin 0-6 Athletic Grounds
 Mar 13 Kildare 1-13 Dublin 0-4 Craobh Chiarain
 Mar 13 Meath 3-12 Roscommon 0-3 Trim
 Mar 20 Meath 2-11 Armagh 1-11 Armagh Athletic Grounds
 Mar 20 Roscommon 3-12 Dublin 2-10 Craobh Chiarain
 Apr 3 Meath 2-9 Kildare 1-9 Cappagh
 Apr 3 Armagh 0-11 Roscommon 1-4 Knockcroghery

Division 3 table

Division 3 Final
Apr 24 Meath 3-9 Kildare 2-11  Donaghmore, Ashbourne

Division 4

 Feb 13 Cavan 4-10 Tyrone 2-6 Breffni Park
 Feb 27 Cavan 4-3 Carlow 2-3 Bagenalstown
 Mar 20 Westmeath 2-6 Cavan Breffni Park
 Apr 3 Westmeath 5-5 Tyrone 3-8 Collinstown

Division 4 table

Division 4 Final
Apr 24 Westmeath 4-6 Cavan 2-7  Donaghmore, Ashbourne

References

National Camogie League, 2011
2011